The 1922 Haskell Indians football team was an American football team that represented the Haskell Institute (later renamed Haskell Indian Nations University) as an independent during the 1922 college football season.  In its first season under head coach Dick Hanley, the team compiled an 8–2 record and outscored opponents by a total of 307 to 89. The victories included a 102–7 triumph over Kansas City University and a 12–0 loss against an undefeated Marquette team.

Fullback John Levi, also known as "Skee", was the team captain. Levi developed a reputation in 1922 as a strong punter, passer, and open field runner.

Schedule

References

Haskell
Haskell Indian Nations Fighting Indians football seasons
Haskell Indians football